Mangini may refer to:

People
Cecilia Mangini (1927–2021), Italian film director
Eric Mangini (born 1971), American football coach
Jose Thiago Mangini (1920–1984), Brazilian chess master
Mark Mangini (born 1956), American sound editor
Mike Mangini (born 1963), American drummer
Janet Mangini, American lawyer in the Joe Camel controversy

Places
Talhi Mangini, a town in Pakistan